Arg Bala castle is a historical castle located in Bojnord County in North Khorasan Province, The longevity of this fortress dates back to the Parthian Empire.

References 

Castles in Iran
Parthian castles